Nowe Sadłuki  is a settlement in the administrative district of Gmina Frombork, within Braniewo County, Warmian-Masurian Voivodeship, in northern Poland.

Location

Population
The settlement has a population of 67.

History
Before 1772 the area was part of Kingdom of Poland, from 1772-1945 it was a part of Prussia and Germany (East Prussia).

References

Villages in Braniewo County